Supergrass is the third album by the English alternative rock band Supergrass. It was released in the UK on 20 September 1999 and reached #3. It is often referred to as "the X-ray album", due to the picture on the sleeve. In Australia a free CD was included with some live tracks. In 2022, the album was remastered and reissued as a 2CD deluxe edition, which includes new remixes of several of the songs created by John Leckie and John Cornfield among other bonus tracks.

Track listing

All tracks written by Supergrass/Rob Coombes.

CD 5220562 / TC 5220564 / 12"  5220561 / MD 5220569
"Moving" (4:26)
"Your Love" (3:27) This features a harpsichord in the outro.
"What Went Wrong (In Your Head)" (4:05)
"Beautiful People" (3:22)
"Shotover Hill" (3:43)
"Eon" (3:44)
"Mary" (4:00)
"Jesus Came from Outta Space" (4:10)
"Pumping on Your Stereo" (3:20)
"Born Again" (3:38)
"Faraway" (5:05)
"Mama & Papa" (2:30)

LTD. ED. CD  5220560

This was free with a limited number of CD releases of Supergrass.
 Exclusive Band Photographs
 Full Discography
 "Caught by the Fuzz (video)" (2:19)
 "Time (video)" (3:12)

LTD. ED. Mary Live Bonus CD (AUS only)

The Australian release of the album in 1999 came with a bonus live EP to coincide with the Australian leg of Supergrass' tour.
"Mary (from Lamacq Live)" (4:02)
"Pumping on Your Stereo (live from Peel Acres)" (3:12)
"Strange Ones (live from Peel Acres)" (3:57)
"Richard III (live from Peel Acres)" (3:29)
"Sun Hits the Sky (live from Peel Acres)" (4:44)

2022 Deluxe Edition CD2

 Moving - John Leckie and Mick Quinn 2022 Remix (5:22)
 Beautiful People - John Cornfield and Mick Quinn 2022 Remix (3:54)
 Pumping On Your Stereo - John Leckie and Mick Quinn 2022 Remix (3:47)
 Born Again - John Cornfield and Mick Quinn 2022 Remix (3:34)
 Wild Wind - Demo (1:50)
 Pumping On Your Stereo - Live at T in the Park, 2000 (3:15)
 Lucky (No Fear) (3:09)
 Blockades - Studio Outtake (4:12)
 Sick (3:40)
 You’ll Never Walk Again (2:19)
 What A Shame (2:40)
 Moving - Live at T in the Park, 2000 (4:52)
 Believer (3:47)
 Faraway (Acoustic Version) (4:55)
 Out Of The Blue - Monitor Mix (2:14)
 Mary - Live at City Varieties, Leeds, 2005 (3:09)
 Country Number - Demo (3:38)
 Born Again - Live at The Forum, Melbourne, 2000 (3:52)
 Jesus Came From Outta Space - Live from 107.7 The End, Seattle (3:26)
 Oracle (3:41)

Supergrass

Gaz Coombes – lead vocals, guitar
Danny Goffey – drums, backing vocals
Mick Quinn – bass guitar, backing vocals, lead vocals on "Beautiful People" and "Mama & Papa", co-lead vocals on "Mary" and "Faraway"

(entire band is also credited with "bells, whistles & bicycle pumps")

Additional musicians
Rob Coombes – keyboards
Satin Singh – percussion
Gavyn Wright, Patrick Kieran, Boguslav Kostecki, Jackie Shave – violins
Bill Benham, Andrew Parker – violas
Martin Loveday, Frank Shaefer – cellos

Charts

Weekly charts

Year-end charts

References

External links

Supergrass at YouTube (streamed copy where licensed)

Supergrass albums
1999 albums
Parlophone albums
Albums produced by John Cornfield
Albums with cover art by The Designers Republic